Luthando Mnyanda (born 22 October 1989) is a South African cricketer. He was included in the South Western Districts cricket team squad for the 2015 Africa T20 Cup.

References

External links
 

1989 births
Living people
South African cricketers
Border cricketers
South Western Districts cricketers
Cricketers from East London, Eastern Cape